Hurricane Larry was a strong and long-lived Cape Verde hurricane that became the first hurricane to make landfall in Newfoundland since Igor in 2010. The twelfth named storm, fifth hurricane, and third major hurricane of the 2021 Atlantic hurricane season, Larry originated from a tropical wave that emerged off the coast of Africa and organized into a tropical depression on August 31. The next day, the depression developed into a tropical storm, receiving the name Larry. The storm moved quickly across the far eastern tropical Atlantic, where it strengthened into a Category 1 hurricane the morning of September 2. Then, after undergoing a period of rapid intensification, Larry became a major Category 3 hurricane early on September 4. After churning for several days as a strong hurricane in the open ocean, Larry made landfall in Newfoundland on September 11, as a Category 1 hurricane. Later that day, Larry became an extratropical cyclone. Finally, on September 13, Larry was absorbed by a larger extratropical cyclone near Greenland.

Larry passed to the east of Bermuda as a Category 1 hurricane, causing minimal damage. Swells generated by Larry's powerful and expansive wind field killed three people offshore the East Coast of the United States, one off the coast of Puerto Rico, and another in the U.S. Virgin Islands. In Newfoundland, Larry caused over 60,000 power outages and damaged buildings. Larry killed five people and caused an estimated $80 million (2021 USD) in damages.

Meteorological history 

On August 26, the National Hurricane Center (NHC) was monitoring a tropical wave that was going to emerge off the coast of West Africa. The tropical wave exited Africa on August 30, surrounded by an area of low pressure that had generally westward movement. Six hours later, the depression became a tropical storm, receiving the name Larry. Larry moved generally westward over the next few days, steadily strengthening due to favorable conditions such as low wind shear, high moisture levels, and high sea surface temperatures. The storm underwent some strengthening on September 1, with a small inner-core forming that afternoon.

Later on September 2, Larry encountered wind shear and dry mid-level air, and its intensification paused briefly. At 12:00 UTC, Larry developed a well-defined eye that was visible on satellite imagery, and at 00:00 UTC the next day, Larry became a Category 3 major hurricane.

On the afternoon of September 4, Larry underwent an eyewall replacement cycle, and decreased slightly in intensity, though remaining at Category 3 strength. Early on September 6, Larry weakened again, while maintaining annular features. It had also reached the western extent of the subtropical ridge by then, and started moving more sharply to the north, over the central Atlantic.

Early on September 10, Larry started moving north, and began to accelerate due to the presence of a mid-latitude trough. Increasing wind shear and decreasing sea surface temperatures caused Larry to weaken further, and at 12:00 UTC on September 10, Larry reached . Extratropical Cyclone Larry weakened slightly before, at 00:00 UTC on September 12, it was absorbed by another extratropical cyclone moving east in the Labrador Sea.

Preparations and impact

Bermuda 

At 15:00 UTC on September 7, the Bermuda Weather Service issued a tropical storm watch as tropical storm conditions were possible. The following day at 12:00 UTC, the watch was upgraded to a warning. At 00:00 UTC, September 9, the Bermuda Weather Service discontinued the warning. No power outages were recorded.

United States 
Although Larry remained far away from the United States and its territories, large swells from the hurricane reached the East Coast, as well as Puerto Rico and the U.S. Virgin Islands. Rip currents killed a woman in Saint Croix on September 8 and a man in Puerto Rico on September 11. In Florida, the National Weather Service issued a rip current warning for beach areas. In Cape Canaveral, a 69-year-old man drowned due to rip currents. On September 8, a 68-year-old man drowned offshore a beach in South Carolina. A 23-year-old man was caught in a rip current off the Virginia coast and died.

Canada 

Larry passed south of Nova Scotia on the way to Newfoundland/Labrador. Resources were dispatched from the United States Coast Guard rescue co-ordination centre in Boston and the Joint Rescue Coordination Centre Halifax. Flares were seen but no trace was ever found of the vessel or the person believed to have been on board.

UTC, while Cape St. Mary's Lighthouse reported a gust of  before ceasing transmission. The storm surge coincided with a high tide, exacerbating coastal flooding.

In the eastern part of the province, 60,000 people were without power after Larry passed through. Trees were uprooted and branches were littered across the ground. The Mary Queen of Peace Elementary School in St. John's was severely damaged. The performance tent near Quidi Vidi Lake, set up for the Iceberg Alley concert festival, suffered significant damage, and a show scheduled for September 10 was cancelled in advance of Larry. Mayor Danny Breen confirmed that the hurricane caused a significant amount of damage around the city. The Newfoundland and Labrador Department of Transportation and Infrastructure has asked motorists to avoid the area of Highway 90 in the southern Avalon Peninsula because a section was damaged. Numerous activities in the affected area and some flights at St. John's International Airport have been canceled or postponed. St. Clare's Mercy Hospital lost power during the storm, leading them to temporarily stop visitations. Advance polls for the 2021 Canadian federal election were suspended in parts of St. John's.

In Lord's Cove, near Saint-Pierre-et-Miquelon, damage was caused to the infrastructures, including to the wharf, the seawall, and the causeway. At North Harbour, a kilometre-long stretch of the main road was washed out by large waves and storm surge. Over 90,000 salmon at an aquaculture facility off the south coast of Newfoundland died after concentrations of dissolved oxygen fell significantly while Larry passed over the area. A report by the Catastrophe Indices and Quantification (CATIQ) stated that the damage in Canada was about 25 million Canadian dollars.

Greenland 
In Greenland, the snowfall forecast for ex-Larry, one of the few storms from the remnants of a tropical cyclone to pass so far north, was up to 4 feet of snow (120 cm) with some places along the coast receiving a rainfall equivalent.

See also

 Other storms of the same name
 Weather of 2021
 Tropical cyclones in 2021
 List of Category 3 Atlantic hurricanes
 Hurricane Gert (1999) – A category 4 hurricane that took a similar path.
 Hurricane Erin (2001) – A category 3 hurricane that took a similar path in September 2001.
 Hurricane Igor (2010) – A category 4 hurricane that took a nearly identical track.
 Hurricane Teddy (2020) – A category 4 hurricane that took a similar path in September 2020.
 Hurricane Sam (2021) – A high-end category 4 hurricane that took a similar path two weeks later.

Notes

References

External links 

The NHC's Advisory Archive on Hurricane Larry

Category 3 Atlantic hurricanes
Hurricanes in Canada
Natural disasters in Newfoundland and Labrador
2021 Atlantic hurricane season
L